Roscrea Friary is a ruined medieval Franciscan friary and National Monument located in Roscrea, County Tipperary, Ireland. It is on Abbey Street, in the west end of Roscrea, on the north bank of the River Bunnow. The Friary was founded in the 15th century by Greyfriars (Franciscans) and later destroyed by British soldiers. What remains are the north and east walls and the bell-tower.

History
Tradition ascribes the first foundation of a monastery here to Crónán of Roscrea (died 640).

Roscrea Friary was founded before 1477 by the Order of Friars Minor Conventual (Greyfriars) by Maolruanaidh Ó Cerbaill (Mulrooney O'Carroll, King of Éile; 1390–c.1480) and his wife Bibiana (née Dempsey).

It was reformed c. 1490 for the Order of Friars Minor. The present buildings date to that period.

The friary was dissolved c. 1577–79 and destroyed by English soldiers. Fr Thady O'Daly escaped capture but was later hanged in Limerick.

The friary's land was granted to Connor O'Brien, 3rd Earl of Thomond c. 1568, who assigned it to William Crow. ed

Some of the friary stone may have been used to build the Catholic church in the 18th century.

Buildings
Remaining are the north and east walls and the central bell-tower.

The bell-tower is two storeys high and is crenellated. The tower is carried on pointed arches which have a chamfered soffit order, on moulded corbels.

References

15th-century establishments in Ireland
16th-century disestablishments in Ireland
Franciscan monasteries in the Republic of Ireland
Religion in County Tipperary
Archaeological sites in County Tipperary
National Monuments in County Tipperary
Roscrea